The 1913 New Mexico A&M Aggies football team was an American football team that represented New Mexico College of Agriculture and Mechanical Arts (now known as New Mexico State University) during the 1913 college football season.  In their fourth and final year under head coach Art Badenoch, the Aggies compiled a 7–0–1 record and outscored all opponents by a total of 122 to 24. The team played its home games on Miller Field, sometimes also referred to as College Field.

Seventeen players received the school's football insignia for their roles on the 1913 team: Fred Quesenberry (left end); Joe Quesenberry (left tackle and captain); Mitchell (left guard); Gardner (center); Isaacs (right guard); Powers (right tackle); Hamilton (right end); Lane (L.Q.); Tuttle (R.Q.); Holt (left halfback); Brainard (right halfback); and substitutes Maynard, Rea, Roberts, Frenger, Wooten, and Sessoms.

Schedule

References

New Mexico AandM
New Mexico State Aggies football seasons
College football undefeated seasons
New Mexico AandM Aggies football